Lee Kyung Eun (born ) is a South Korean group rhythmic gymnast. She represents her nation at international competitions. She competed at world championships, including at the 2015 World Rhythmic Gymnastics Championships.

References

1992 births
Living people
South Korean rhythmic gymnasts
Place of birth missing (living people)
21st-century South Korean women